Jane Bidstrup (born 21 August 1955) is a Danish curler and Olympic medalist. She received a silver medal at the 1998 Winter Olympics in Nagano. She was part of the bronze-team at the 1997 World Curling Championships.

References

1955 births
Living people
Danish female curlers
Curlers at the 1998 Winter Olympics
Olympic silver medalists for Denmark
Olympic curlers of Denmark
Olympic medalists in curling
Medalists at the 1998 Winter Olympics
20th-century Danish women